The ZZ-R1200 or ZX-12C, is a sport bike made by Kawasaki from (2002-2005). Identified by its model number ZX1200-C1, it is the successor to the ZX-11(1990-2001).  Considered a sport tourer, it had a twin-spar aluminum frame and a liquid-cooled, DOHC, four-stroke inline-four engine. It has twin fans, fuel pumps, and headlights. Additionally, hard touring bags can be added as an option. With factory rear wheel horsepower of 145HP; it is widely regarded to be the most powerful production motorcycle ever built with carbureted induction. It was even more powerful than the fuel injected Honda CBR1100XX. It has been said it was more powerful than any other production motorcycle carbureted or not at 9,800 rpm where it made peak power except the Suzuki Hayabusa or ZX-12R.With a quarter mile time of 10.12  seconds at 136.9 mph.

Notes

References

External links
Kawasaki official web site

ZZ-R1200
Motorcycles introduced in 2002
Products and services discontinued in 2005
Sport touring motorcycles